The Utah Trail is a 1938 American Western film directed by Albert Herman. It was Tex Ritter's final film for Grand National Films. Despite the song and title, the film takes place on the Arizona/Mexico border and not Utah. The film is based on a short story that appeared in Ranch Romances magazine.

Plot
Tex is asked by the owner of a railroad to investigate a ghost train. Upon his arrival with his friends Ananias and Pee Wee, they find the railroad is run by the owner's daughter Sally after the owner's murder. Sally wants no part of Tex, posing as "The Pecos Kid", but Tex and his friends track down the train being used by rustlers.

Cast 
Tex Ritter as Tex Stewart, posing as the Pecos Kid
White Flash as Tex's Horse
Horace Murphy as Ananias
"Snub" Pollard as Pee Wee
Pamela Blake as Sally Jeffers
Karl Hackett as Hiram Slaughter
Charles King as Henchman Badger
Ed Cassidy as Sheriff Clayton
Dave O'Brien as Mason – Bookkeeper
Bud Osborne as Henchman Hank
Lynton Brent as Henchman Cheyenne
Rudy Sooter as Bandleader / Singer
The Texas Tornadoes as Saloon Band

Soundtrack 
Tex Ritter – "Utah Trail" (Written by Bob Palmer)
Tex Ritter – "Give Me Back My Saddle" (Written by Frank Harford)
Tex Ritter – "A Mighty Good Horse" (Written by Frank Harford)
Tex Ritter, Horace Murphy and "Snub" Pollard – "A'Roamin' I'll Be" (Written by Frank Harford)
Rudy Sooter – "Won't You Be My Buckaroo?" (Written by Rudy Sooter)

External links 
 
 

1938 films
1938 Western (genre) films
American Western (genre) films
American black-and-white films
Films directed by Albert Herman
Grand National Films films
1930s English-language films
1930s American films
Rail transport films